The Piraeus University of Applied Sciences (A.E.I. Πειραιά Τ.Τ.), also known as Technological Education Institute of Piraeus (TEIPIR), was a public higher education institute supervised by the Ministry of Education and Research. It was created by a special law in 1976 as a merging result of the Anastasiadis School (founded in 1947) and the Sivitanidios School (founded in 1957), and was established with the 1983 related law (Ν.1404/1983).

In 2018 TEI of Piraeus merged with TEI of Athens forming the newly established University of West Attica.

Overview
The Piraeus University of Applied Sciences used to provide a high level of technological education and applied research in the equivalent taught areas, offering more than twenty different degrees that range from Engineering to Economics and Business Administration.

The school was one of the independent and self-administrated Applied Sciences Universities (also known as Technological Education Institutes) in accordance with the related Greek laws 2916/2001, 3549/2007 and 4009/2011. Technological Education Institutes differ from other Greek Universities in the applied character of their studies, placing emphasis on laboratory courses and internships.

Schools and departments
The institution included two Schools, consisting of nine Departments.

Postgraduate education
The Piraeus University of Applied Sciences used to offer several approved graduate courses independently or in cooperation with universities and abroad.

Campus
The university campus is in a grove 100,000 sq.m in the wider area which housed the Academy of Plato. The facilities are accessible with bus services and metro connection to the rest of Athens and are currently used by University of West Attica.

See also 
 List of universities in Greece
 Technological Educational Institute of Athens

References

External links
 TEI of Piraeus Official Website
 University of West Attica Official Website 
 Hellenic Quality Assurance and Accreditation Agency (HQAA) 

1976 establishments in Greece
Educational institutions established in 1976